Seconds is the third album released by Kate Rogers.
Her first album was a compilation of her guest appearances as vocalist on Grand Central Records releases, entitled Kate Rogers Vs Grand Central. This was followed by St. Eustacia, an album of original material, written and performed by Rogers.

Seconds consists of 8 somewhat surprising cover versions in Kate's downtempo style, plus one new original track, written and performed with Grand Central Records label-mate, Jon Kennedy

Track listing
 "Bigmouth Strikes Again" (The Smiths cover)  – 3:47
 "Climbing Up the Walls" (Radiohead cover)  – 3:46
 "Sail" (Aim & Kate Rogers)  – 4:42
 "Here Comes Your Man" (The Pixies cover)  – 3:18
 "Big Me" (Foo Fighters cover)  – 2:01
 "Broken Arrow" (Neil Young/Buffalo Springfield cover)  – 3:57
 "I Miss You" (Blink-182 cover)  – 3:11
 "Brain Stew" (Green Day cover)  – 2:44
 "Nothing Appeals To Me Here" (Kate Rogers & Jon Kennedy)  – 5:19

Grand Central Records albums
2005 albums
Covers albums